Víctor Hugo Sarabia Aguilar (born 27 November 1983) is a Chilean footballer who currently plays as central midfielder.

External links
 Sarabia at Football Lineups
 

1983 births
Living people
Chilean footballers
Cobresal footballers
Ñublense footballers
Lota Schwager footballers
C.D. Huachipato footballers
Deportes Iquique footballers
Naval de Talcahuano footballers
Chilean Primera División players
Primera B de Chile players
Association football midfielders
People from Talcahuano